Tridenchthonius is a genus of pseudoscorpions in the family Tridenchthoniidae. There are about 16 described species in Tridenchthonius.

Species
These 16 species belong to the genus Tridenchthonius:

References

Further reading

External links

 

Tridenchthoniidae
Pseudoscorpion genera